Baron Herbert of Lea, of Lea in the County of Wiltshire, is a title in the Peerage of the United Kingdom, since 1862 a subsidiary title of the earldom of Pembroke. 

The barony was created in 1861 for the politician Sidney Herbert, the fourth son of George Herbert, 11th Earl of Pembroke, and the territorial designation referred to Lea, Wiltshire.

Lord Herbert of Lea died only a few months after his elevation to the peerage and was succeeded by his son George, the second Baron, who the following year succeeded a cousin in the earldom of Pembroke. The titles remain united, the current holder being William Alexander Sidney Herbert, 18th Earl of Pembroke, 15th Earl of  Montgomery. The heir apparent is his son, Reginald Henry Michael Herbert, Lord Herbert, born on 21 October 2012.

Barons Herbert of Lea (1861)
Sidney Herbert, 1st Baron Herbert of Lea (1810–1861)
George Robert Charles Herbert, 2nd Baron Herbert of Lea (1850–1895) (succeeded as Earl of Pembroke in 1862)
see Earl of Pembroke, tenth creation, for further succession

References

Baron
1861 establishments in the United Kingdom

Baronies in the Peerage of the United Kingdom
Noble titles created in 1861
Noble titles created for UK MPs